Events in the year 2023 in Cameroon.

Incumbents
President: Paul Biya
Prime Minister: Joseph Ngute

Events

 22 January – Police in Cameroon find the mutilated body of prominent journalist Martinez Zogo who had been kidnapped by unknown assailants five days ago, amid increasing violence against reporters in the country.
 25 February – Nineteen athletes are injured by small explosions during the Mount Cameroon Race of Hope in Buea, Southwest Region. The Ambazonia Defence Forces claim responsibility for the incident.

Deaths

3 January – Armand Joel Banaken Bassoken, footballer (born 1983).
7 January – Modeste M'bami, footballer (born 1982).
17 January – Martinez Zogo, journalist.
21 January – Gabriel Dodo Ndoke, politician (born 1971).

See also
Timeline of the Anglophone Crisis (2023)

References

 
2020s in Cameroon
Years of the 21st century in Cameroon
Cameroon
Cameroon